Heike Kamerlingh Onnes (21 September 1853 – 21 February 1926) was a Dutch physicist and Nobel laureate. He exploited the Hampson–Linde cycle to investigate how materials behave when cooled to nearly absolute zero and later to liquefy helium for the first time, in 1908. He also discovered superconductivity in 1911.

Biography

Early years
Kamerlingh Onnes was born in Groningen, Netherlands. His father, Harm Kamerlingh Onnes, was a brickworks owner. His mother was Anna Gerdina Coers of Arnhem.

In 1870, Kamerlingh Onnes attended the University of Groningen. He studied under Robert Bunsen and Gustav Kirchhoff at the University of Heidelberg from 1871 to 1873. Again at Groningen, he obtained his master's degree in 1878 and a doctorate in 1879. His thesis was Nieuwe bewijzen voor de aswenteling der aarde (tr. New proofs of the rotation of the earth). From 1878 to 1882 he was assistant to Johannes Bosscha, the director of the Delft Polytechnic, for whom he substituted as lecturer in 1881 and 1882.

Family
He was married to Maria Adriana Wilhelmina Elisabeth Bijleveld (m. 1887) and had one child, named Albert. His brother Menso Kamerlingh Onnes (1860–1925) was a painter (and father of another painter, Harm Kamerlingh Onnes), while his sister Jenny married another painter, Floris Verster (1861–1927).

University of Leiden

From 1882 to 1923 Kamerlingh Onnes served as professor of experimental physics at the University of Leiden. In 1904 he founded a very large cryogenics laboratory and invited other researchers to the location, which made him highly regarded in the scientific community. The laboratory is known now as Kamerlingh Onnes Laboratory. Only one year after his appointment as professor he became member of the Royal Netherlands Academy of Arts and Sciences.

Liquefaction of helium

On 10 July 1908, he was the first to liquefy helium, using several precooling stages and the Hampson–Linde cycle based on the Joule–Thomson effect. This way he lowered the temperature to the boiling point of helium (−269 °C, 4.2 K). By reducing the pressure of the liquid helium he achieved a temperature near 1.5 K. These were the coldest temperatures achieved on earth at the time. The equipment employed is at the Museum Boerhaave in Leiden.

Superconductivity
In 1911 Kamerlingh Onnes measured the electrical conductivity of pure metals (mercury, and later tin and lead) at very low temperatures. Some scientists, such as William Thomson (Lord Kelvin), believed that electrons flowing through a conductor would come to a complete halt or, in other words, metal resistivity would become infinitely large at absolute zero. Others, including Kamerlingh Onnes, felt that a conductor's electrical resistance would steadily decrease and drop to nil. Augustus Matthiessen said that when the temperature decreases, the metal conductivity usually improves or in other words, the electrical resistivity usually decreases with a decrease of temperature.

On 8 April 1911, Kamerlingh Onnes found that at 4.2 K the resistance in a solid mercury wire immersed in liquid helium suddenly vanished. He immediately realized the significance of the discovery (as became clear when his notebook was deciphered a century later). He reported that "Mercury has passed into a new state, which on account of its extraordinary electrical properties may be called the superconductive state". He published more articles about the phenomenon, initially referring to it as "supraconductivity" and, only later adopting the term "superconductivity".

Kamerlingh Onnes received widespread recognition for his work, including the 1913 Nobel Prize in Physics for (in the words of the committee) "his investigations on the properties of matter at low temperatures which led, inter alia, to the production of liquid helium".

Legacy

Some of the instruments Kamerlingh Onnes devised for his experiments can be seen at the Boerhaave Museum in Leiden. The apparatus he used to first liquefy helium is on display in the lobby of the physics department at Leiden University, where the low-temperature lab is also named in his honor. His student and successor as director of the lab Willem Hendrik Keesom was the first person who was able to solidify helium, in 1926. The former Kamerlingh Onnes laboratory building is currently the Law Faculty at Leiden University and is known as "Kamerlingh Onnes Gebouw" (Kamerlingh Onnes Building), often shortened to "KOG". The current science faculty has a "Kamerlingh Onnes Laboratorium" named after him, as well as a plaque and several machines used by Kamerling Onnes in the main hall of the physics department.

The Kamerlingh Onnes Award (1948) and the Kamerlingh Onnes Prize (2000) were established in his honour, recognising further advances in low-temperature science.

The Onnes effect referring to the creeping of superfluid helium is named in his honor.

The crater Kamerlingh Onnes on the Moon is named after him.

Onnes is also credited with coining the word "enthalpy".

Onnes's discovery of superconductivity was named an IEEE Milestone in 2011.

Honors and awards
Matteucci Medal (1910)
Rumford Medal (1912)
Nobel Prize in Physics (1913)
Franklin Medal (1915)

Selected publications
 Kamerlingh Onnes, H., "Nieuwe bewijzen voor de aswenteling der aarde." Ph.D. dissertation. Groningen, Netherlands, 1879.
 Kamerlingh Onnes, H., "Algemeene theorie der vloeistoffen." Amsterdam Akad. Verhandl; 21, 1881.
 Kamerlingh Onnes, H., "On the Cryogenic Laboratory at Leyden and on the Production of Very Low Temperature." Comm. Phys. Lab. Univ. Leiden; 14, 1894.
 Kamerlingh Onnes, H., "Théorie générale de l'état fluide." Haarlem Arch. Neerl.; 30, 1896.
 Kamerlingh Onnes, H., "Further experiments with liquid helium. C. On the change of electric resistance of pure metals at very low temperatures, etc. IV. The resistance of pure mercury at helium temperatures." Comm. Phys. Lab. Univ. Leiden; No. 120b, 1911.
 Kamerlingh Onnes, H., "Further experiments with liquid helium. D. On the change of electric resistance of pure metals at very low temperatures, etc. V. The disappearance of the resistance of mercury." Comm. Phys. Lab. Univ. Leiden; No. 122b, 1911.
 Kamerlingh Onnes, H., "Further experiments with liquid helium. G. On the electrical resistance of pure metals, etc. VI. On the sudden change in the rate at which the resistance of mercury disappears." Comm. Phys. Lab. Univ. Leiden; No. 124c, 1911.
 Kamerlingh Onnes, H., "On the Lowest Temperature Yet Obtained." Comm. Phys. Lab. Univ. Leiden; No. 159, 1922.

See also
 Timeline of low-temperature technology
 Timeline of states of matter and phase transitions
 Coldest temperature achieved on earth
 List of Nobel laureates
 History of superconductivity

References

Further reading
 
 
 
 Van Delft, D. Freezing Physics: Heike Kamerlingh Onnes and the Quest for Cold
 Levelt-Sengers, J. M. H., How fluids unmix : discoveries by the School of Van der Waals and Kamerlingh Onnes. Amsterdam, Koninklijke Nederlandse Akademie van Wetenschappen, 2002. .
 Kamerlingh Onnes, Heike, (Gavroglou, Kōstas. [ed.], and Goudaroulis, Yorgos [ed.]) Through measurement to knowledge : the selected papers of Heike Kamerlingh Onnes (1853–1926). Dordrecht, Boston, Kluwer Academic Publishers, c1991. Goudaroulis, Yorgos. 
 International Institute of Refrigeration (First International Commission), Rapports et communications issus du Laboratoire Kamerlingh Onnes. International Congress of Refrigeration (7th; 1936; La Hauge), Amsterdam, 1936.

External links

 
 including the Nobel Lecture, 11 December 1913 Investigations into the Properties of Substances at Low Temperatures, which Have Led, amongst Other Things, to the Preparation of Liquid Helium
About Heike Kamerlingh Onnes, Nobel-winners.com.
 J. van den Handel, Kamerlingh Onnes, Heike (1853–1926), in Biografisch Woordenboek van Nederland. (In Dutch).
 Leiden University historical web site
 Correspondence with James Dewar, the main competitor in the race to liquid helium.
 Communications from the Kamerlingh Onnes Laboratory (1885–1898).
 Ph.D. students of Kamerlingh Onnes (1885-1924).

1853 births
1926 deaths
20th-century Dutch physicists
Cryogenics
Dutch Nobel laureates
20th-century Dutch inventors
Academic staff of Leiden University
Nobel laureates in Physics
Corresponding Members of the Russian Academy of Sciences (1917–1925)
Corresponding Members of the USSR Academy of Sciences
Members of the Royal Netherlands Academy of Arts and Sciences
Foreign Members of the Royal Society
Foreign associates of the National Academy of Sciences
Scientists from Groningen (city)
University of Groningen alumni
Heidelberg University alumni
Academic staff of the Delft University of Technology
Recipients of the Matteucci Medal